A Virtual Manufacturing Network is a manufacturing network which is not owned by a simple company, but it is built with the use of ICT for bringing together different suppliers and alliance partners creating in such a way a virtual network which is able to operate as a solely owned supply network. 
A Virtual Manufacturing Network is in this way a Collaborative network of manufacturing enterprises (from OEMs to Suppliers), which are connected by means of ICT for configuring, managing and monitoring the manufacturing process.

Many companies have adopted a philosophy of acquiring worldwide resources through a virtual network for minimizing expenses in their whole operation, focusing on core competences and relying to other companies with specific expertise to take over the parts of the manufacturing process they cannot perform by themselves.
The evolution of a Virtual Manufacturing Network is a Dynamic Manufacturing Network, which describes a more flexible and agile manufacturing network, that is able to be instantiated or dissolved quite rapidly, in order to meet emerging market needs and business opportunities.

Notes 

Manufacturing
Networks